The 2019 Real Salt Lake season is the team's 15th year of existence, and their 15th consecutive season in Major League Soccer, the top division of the American soccer pyramid.

Background

Non-competitive

Preseason

2019 Pacific Rim Cup

Mobile Mini Sun Cup

Competitions

MLS regular season

2019 Major League Soccer season

Standings

Western Conference table

Overall table

Results summary

Match results

MLS Cup playoffs

U.S. Open Cup

Leagues Cup

Stats

Squad appearances and goals
Last updated October 24, 2019.

|-
! colspan="14" style="background:#A51E36; color:#DAAC27; text-align:center"|Goalkeepers

|-
! colspan="14" style="background:#A51E36; color:#DAAC27; text-align:center"|Defenders

|-
! colspan="14" style="background:#A51E36; color:#DAAC27; text-align:center"|Midfielders

|-
! colspan="14" style="background:#A51E36; color:#DAAC27; text-align:center"|Forwards

|-
! colspan=14 style="background:#A51E36; color:#DAAC27; text-align:center"|Other players (Departed during season, short-term loan, etc.)

|-
|}

0+1 means player came on as a sub once. 1+1 means player started once and came on as a sub once.

Goals, assists, and shutouts
Stats from MLS Regular season, MLS playoffs, CONCACAF Champions league, and U.S. Open Cup are all included.
First tie-breaker for goals is assists; first for assists and shutouts is minutes played.

Club

Roster
 Age calculated as of the start of the 2019 season.
,

Transfers
''

In

Out

Notes

Loans

In

Out

Trialist

References 

Real Salt Lake seasons
Real Salt Lake season, 2019
Real Salt Lake